Pulapaka Susheela (born 13 November 1935), popularly known as P. Susheela,  is an Indian playback singer associated with the South Indian cinema primarily from Andhra Pradesh for over six decades. She is one of the greatest and best-known playback singers in India. She has been recognized by the Guinness Book of World Records as well as by the Asia Book of Records for performing a record number of songs in different Indian languages. She is also the recipient of five National Film Award for Best Female Playback Singer and numerous state awards.  Susheela is widely acclaimed as a singer who defined feminism in South Indian cinema and is well known for her mellifluous vocal performances for over 40,000 film songs across South Indian languages.

The song "Paal Polave" from Tamil film Uyarndha Manidhan brought her the first ever award at the 16th National Film Awards, by winning her the National Film Award for Best Female Playback Singer in 1969. Susheela became the first ever female singer in the country to win the national award. She is also considered one of the rich voiced singers whose pronunciation of the syllables are to be very clear and precise in any of the languages she sang. In a career spanning more than six decades, she has recorded nearly 71,835 songs in various Indian languages including Telugu, Tamil, Kannada, Malayalam, Hindi, Bengali, Oriya, Sanskrit, Tulu and Badaga. She has also sung for Sinhalese films. Her mother tongue is Telugu. She can also speak Tamil fluently, with a little Hindi, Malayalam and Kannada.

Personal life
Susheela was born in Andhra Pradesh, India, as the daughter of Pulapaka Mukunda Rao, a leading advocate in Vizianagaram, Vizianagaram District, Andhra Pradesh State. She was married to Dr. Mohan Rao, who died in 1990; they have a son named Jayakrishna. Her niece, Sandhya Jayakrishna, who later became her daughter in law, is a singer who debuted with A. R. Rahman in Iruvar and she has two grand daughters.One of them is Shuba Sri and she is the lead guitarist with music director Thaman S.

Education
After completion of schooling, Susheela joined in Maharaja's Music College under the tutelage of Dwaram Venkataswamy Naidu who was the Principal, Vizianagaram, and completed Diploma in Music from Andhra University in First Class at a very early age.

P. Susheela went on to become the most successful playback singer of South India from 1950 to 1990.

Career

Debut : 1950–1954
Born into a music-loving family, Susheela had been nurtured with formal classical music training at a very young age. She used to participate in all the musical competitions at her school and Vizianagaram town events. She developed the crucial nuances in singing songs with apt expressions and modulations through her extensive training during those days. She also sang few songs for the All India Radio (AIR) for their private program telecasts.

In 1950, music director Pendyala Nageswara Rao was on the look out for some fresh voices to sing for his new film compositions. He approached the AIR to help him shortlist some of the finest singers who have performed for the Radio. AIR sent forward five singers of whom Susheela was selected after some thorough audition tests. She was immediately signed on for the Tamil film Petra Thai (1952) for a duet song "Edhuku Azhaithhai" with A. M. Raja. This was subsequently made in Telugu as Kanna Talli for which she recorded the same duet with Ghantasala. This resulted in her long term employment with AVM Studios singing for their productions alone with a fixed monthly salary. The studio owner A. V. Meiyappan hired a Tamil trainer for Susheela to hone her Tamil pronunciation skills. Thus Susheela began her illustrious career gaining abundant knowledge about music and language. She debuted into Kannada language with the film Maadidunno Maaraya in 1954.

Breakthrough : 1955 – 1960 
It was not easy for a newcomer to foray into the musical scene in the 1950s with the domination of eminent female vocalists like P. Leela, M. L. Vasanthakumari, Jikki among others ruling the playback industry. Yet, Susheela made her own mark with her distinct and clear vocals. The year 1955 saw Susheela raising to popularity with her back to back hit songs both in Tamil and Telugu film industries. Missamma released in 1955 had hugely popular songs backed with strong carnatic classical essence. Susheela created a huge impact among the listeners with her effortless renditions of the toughest notations. The same year released Tamil film Kanavane Kan Kanda Deivam made her a household name in Tamil Nadu.

Thus began a huge legacy of Susheela, who sang in almost all the films produced since 1955 through 1960s and 1970s till 1985. The legendary Tamil musicians Viswanathan – Ramamurthy duo composed some of the most evergreen songs of Tamil cinema history in the voice of Susheela. Her duets with the acclaimed singers Ghantasala in Telugu, T. M. Soundararajan in Tamil and P. B. Srinivas in Kannada marked a new era of duet songs in the South Indian music industry. She, along with T. M. Soundararajan went on to record more than hundreds of songs with Viswanathan – Ramamurthy. Susheela's blockbuster Kannada song "Viraha Nooru Nooru Taraha" for the film Edakallu Guddada Mele is listed as one of the top 10 evergreen songs in Indian cinema. Her combination with actress Jayanthi is very popular in Karnataka.

Successful domination : 1960 – 1985 
The early 1960s saw Susheela grow as an undisputed lead female singer across all the south Indian language films putting all the older veteran singers to the background.  The year 1960 saw Susheela entering the Malayalam films with the V. Dakshinamurthy compositions for the film Seetha. From then, she went on to record numerous hit songs with all the Malayalam composers like G. Devarajan, M. K. Arjunan among others. She recorded many Malayalam duets with the veteran singer K. J. Yesudas. Her association with M.S. Viswanathan continued even after M.S.V split up with Ramamoorthy in 1965 and under M.S.V her duets with T.M. Sounderrajan and others and her solo songs were too popular with audience and made her first choice singer for every other music composer and film producer from 1960 to 1985. M.S.V.'s composition fetched her the first National Film Award for Best Female Playback Singer in 1969 for her prolific rendition of "Naalai Intha Velai Paarthu" for the Tamil film Uyarndha Manidhan. The same song got her the Tamil Nadu State Award as well. Thereby, Susheela became one of the first recipients of the most dignified National awards in India. It was during these years the Nightingale of India, Lata Mangeshkar developed a strong friendship with Susheela and praised all her works frequently. Her work in Film Chandipriya is superb with song "Sri Bhagya Rekha - Janani Janani" with Jaya Prada superb dance. M.S.Viswanathan is regarded as her mentor and in his music direction she has maximum popular hit songs from 1955 to 1995.

The 1970s also saw Susheela in her prime form winning almost all the awards both nationally and in all the four states of Southern India. She also recorded even Hindi songs during this period with music directors like KV Mahdevan, Laxmikant Pyarelal, L. Vaidyanathan and Laxmi Kiran, S.L. Manohar, Ajit merchant, G. Devarajan and S.N. Tripathi. It was in this era that she sang few notable songs for another prolific Indian music director Ilaiyaraja. Though Janaki took a leading position from 1980 with her strong association with M.S.V and Ilayaraja, Susheela continued to be at the top till 1985 and after 1985 was still opted by several music directors for her legendary vocals. After 1986, she became selective about film songs and continued to have hit film songs till 2005.

Shift to non-films : 1985– 2000s 
With S. Janaki and Vani Jayaram taking over the Southern film songs center stage from 1985 and K. S. Chitra beginning her career, Susheela slowly shifted her focus from films to devotionals and light music. But she continued to get to sing melodious film songs from 1984 to 1999 though she had after 1985 cut down on offers for singing in films. She even won awards for songs in Telugu films – Viswanatha Nayakudu in 1987, Godavari Pongindi in 1989 and Tamil film Varam in 1989. She sang duets with Kishore Kumar in 1986 for the film Singhasan – "Chalta Hai Do Dilon Ka Kaise Sansaar" and "Tere Liye Maine Janam" which became popular. She also concentrated more on stage shows across the Globe where many associations worldwide invited her to perform for their organised shows. She recorded more than 1000 devotional songs for various audio companies. In 1988, acclaimed music composer Naushad insisted her to sing "Janaki Jaane" for his Malayalam film Dhwani. She also recorded few of her career best songs for Illayaraja, A. R. Rahman and others in the 1990s. "Kannukku Mai Azhagu" from the film Pudhiya Mugam (1993) composed by Rahman was praised all over for its lyrical content and rendition. She had hit songs in Tamil till 2005 and sang many devotional and folk songs from 1986 to 2005 and did many live shows from 1990 to 2005.

Comeback : 2005– present 

Susheela made a comeback by rendering her voice to her own song Raksha Raksha Jaganmatha which was released 72 years ago and was released as a single for the movie, Aadai, starring Amala Paul.
Susheela also recorded a Tamil song for the film 'LKG' in 2018, alongside Vani Jayaram & L.R.Eswari. Her superhit song 'Elluvochi' from the Telugu film 'Devatha' was reprised in her own voice for the film Gaddalakonda Ganesh in 2019 under Mickey J Meyer's supervision.

P. Susheela Trust 
The P. Susheela Trust, formed in 2008, has a monthly pension payment scheme and a few musicians in need are being benefited through it. On every 13 November there would be a musical concert during which a senior artist(s) chosen by a panel is conferred with the Lifetime Achievement awards and the P Susheela Trust award. The proceedings of the concert would go towards the Trust maintenance.

The Lifetime achievement awards so far has been conferred upon T. M. Soundararajan and P. B. Srinivas. The recipients of the Trust's awards so far are S. Janaki, Vani Jairam, L. R. Eswari, P. Jayachandran, S. P. Balasubrahmanyam and K. J. Yesudas.

Guinness World Records

As verified on 28 January 2016, Susheela has reportedly recorded up to 17,695 solo, duet and chorus backed songs in over six Indian languages since the 1960s, not counting some lost early recordings. She has now been recognized by both the Guinness Book of World Records and Asia Book of Records for singing most songs in Indian languages.

Statistics

Telugu
Susheela has sung more than 12000 songs in Telugu. S. P. Balasubrahmanyam's first duet in Telugu was with P. Susheela. SPB sung his first song with me says the legendary P. Susheela and SPB recorded more than 3000 duets with P. Susheela.  She has recorded more than 2000 songs in K.V.Mahadevans music. she has recorded more than 2000 songs in K.chakravarthys music also. She won three national awards for Telugu songs.

Tamil

She has sung more than 6000 songs in Tamil, including devotionals. She has sung around 1000 duets with T. M. Soundara Rajan. She also rendered more than 1500 Songs in MSV music. She won two national awards for Tamil songs.

Kannada 
Susheela has recorded more than 5000 songs in Kannada. She has performed numerous duets with Ghantasala and P. B. Srinivas, and also a few duets with legendary actor and singer Dr. Rajkumar. Her duets with P. B. Shrinivas are considered some of the evergreen songs of Kannada Film Industry. S. P. Balasubramaniam's first Kannada song Kanasido Nanasido from Nakkare Ade Swarga was a duet with Susheela.

Malayalam
She has sung more than 1500 songs in Malayalam. The musician Devarajan gave her more than 300 songs (in all languages).

Other languages
Susheela has sung more than 300 songs in other languages, including 100 film songs in Hindi, 120 devotional songs in Sanskrit, and 9 film songs in Sinhalese. she also Sang in Bengali. Punjabi, Tulu, Baduga and Oriya songs.

Awards

Civilian and State Government honours

National Film Awards 
She was the first recipient of the national award for female playback singing in 1969.

Filmfare Awards South
Filmfare Lifetime Achievement Award – South (2006)

State Awards

Other Awards
 "Kamban Pugazh" award from All Ceylon Kamban Kazhakam, Sri Lanka, 2016
Best singer of the decade Award from Dr. Subbarami Reddy in 2001
Lifetime Achievement Award at 7th South Indian International Movie Awards

Discography

1950s

1960s

1980s

1990s

References

External links

 
 

1935 births
Living people
Telugu playback singers
Indian women playback singers
Recipients of the Padma Bhushan in arts
Kannada playback singers
Kerala State Film Award winners
Malayalam playback singers
Hindi-language singers
Tamil playback singers
Tamil Nadu State Film Awards winners
Andhra University alumni
20th-century Indian singers
20th-century Indian women singers
Film musicians from Andhra Pradesh
Singers from Andhra Pradesh
21st-century Indian singers
21st-century Indian women singers
Best Female Playback Singer National Film Award winners
People from Vizianagaram district
People from Uttarandhra
South Indian International Movie Awards winners
People from Vizianagaram
Women musicians from Andhra Pradesh
Indian women musicians
Filmfare Awards South winners
Nandi Award winners